Rochelle High School may refer to:
Rochelle Township High School, school in Rochelle, Illinois, United States
Rochelle High School (Florida), former school in Lakeland, Florida, United States